Montreal East (in French: Montréal-Est) is an on-island suburb in southwestern Quebec, Canada, on the island of Montreal. Montreal-Est has been home to many large oil refineries since 1915.

History
The formation of Montréal-Est as a municipality was initiated in 1910 by businessman Joseph Versailles, who had bought  of land there. The town was incorporated on 4 June 1910 under the name Montreal East, when it separated from Pointe-aux-Trembles and Saint-Joseph-de-la-Rivière-des-Prairies. Versailles was mayor of the town until his death in 1931.

On January 1, 2002, as part of the 2002–2006 municipal reorganization of Montreal, it was merged into the City of Montreal and became part of the borough of Rivière-des-Prairies–Pointe-aux-Trembles–Montréal-Est. After a change of government and a 2004 referendum, it was the only community in the eastern half of the Island of Montreal that de-merged, and it was re-constituted as a city on January 1, 2006.

Major streets
Montréal-Est is served by Notre-Dame Street and Sherbrooke Street, which run east-west through large portions of the Island of Montreal.

Montréal-Est joined Westmount as the only Montreal island municipalities to refuse to adopt the name of Boulevard René-Lévesque for their portion of the major east-west street, Dorchester. To this day, the street is called Rue Dorchester in Montréal-Est. It also preserves a section of Rue de Montigny, which has otherwise been replaced by Boulevard de Maisonneuve apart from one block downtown. Rue Sainte-Catherine and Rue Ontario also reappear in Montréal-Est, far away from their main downtown sections.

North-south streets in the city include Avenue Georges-V and Avenue Marien.

Demographics

Economy

There are three refineries that make up the majority of the Montreal Oil Refining Centre:
 Shell Canada Montreal East Refinery : formerly produced 161,000 barrels per day (bpd) before conversion to a storage facility
 Petro Canada Montreal Refinery : 160,000 bpd
 Gulf Canada/Kemtec/Coastal Canada Montreal East Refinery : 65,000 bpd

Total production: 386,000 bpd

Local government

Montréal-Est forms part of the federal electoral district of La Pointe-de-l'Île and has been represented by Mario Beaulieu of the Bloc Québécois since 2015. Provincially, Montréal-Est is part of the Pointe-aux-Trembles electoral district and is represented by Chantal Rouleau of the Coalition Avenir Québec since 2018.

List of former mayors:
 Joseph Versailles (1910–1931)
 Adélard Rivet (1931)
 Albert Berthiaume (1931–1933)
 J.-A. Napoléon Courtemanche (1933–1952)
 Joseph-Émile-Roland MacDuff (1952–1962)
 Édouard Rivet (1962–1982)
 Yvon Labrosse (1982–2002, 2006–2009)
 Robert Coutu (2009–2021)
 Anne St-Laurent (2021–present)

Attractions
The Dufresne-Nincheri Museum, a historic building in the borough of Mercier–Hochelaga-Maisonneuve in Montreal, has the mission to preserve, study, and influence the history and heritage of Montréal-Est (East Montreal). It was originally named the Château Dufresne Museum.

Education
The city is served by two school boards. The French schools are part of the Commission scolaire Pointe-de-l'Ile while the English schools are part of the English Montreal School Board.

Francophone schools:
 École primaire St-Octave

Notable people
Roméo Dallaire, Lieutenant-General (retired), Canadian senator, author
Michel Plasse, professional hockey player (1949–2006)

References

External links

 

 
Cities and towns in Quebec
Island of Montreal municipalities
Populated places established in 1910